The Federal Correctional Institution, Gilmer (FCI Gilmer) is a medium-security United States federal prison for male inmates in West Virginia. It is operated by the Federal Bureau of Prisons, a division of the United States Department of Justice. An adjacent satellite prison camp houses minimum-security male inmates.

FCI Gilmer is located in central West Virginia, 85 miles northeast of Charleston and 150 miles from Pittsburgh, Pennsylvania.

Notable inmates (current and former)

See also
List of U.S. federal prisons
Federal Bureau of Prisons
Incarceration in the United States

References

Gilmer
Gilmer County, West Virginia
Prisons in West Virginia